Acoustic radiation pressure is the apparent pressure difference between the average pressure at a surface moving with the displacement of the wave propagation (the Lagrangian pressure) and the pressure that would have existed in the fluid of the same mean density when at rest. Numerous authors make a distinction between the phenomena of Rayleigh radiation pressure and Langevin radiation pressure.

See also 
 Radiation pressure
 Acoustic levitation
 Acoustic radiation force

References

External links 
 Tokyo University Researchers Using Ultrasound Technology to Enable Touchable Holograms

Acoustics